Blue Cheese & Coney Island is the second solo studio album by American rapper Bizarre. It was released on October 9, 2007 via Koch Records. Production was handled by DubMuzik, Kidd, Rencen, Silent Riot, A Piece of Strange, Alphabet, Jake Bass, Nick Speed, Laidback and Seige. It features guest appearances from King Gordy, Monica Blaire, 7 Nation, DubMuzik, Gam, K.B., Kuniva, Maestro, Razaaq, Scarchild, Tech N9ne, Twiztid and Young Miles.

Track listing

Singles 
 Fat Boy (featuring King Gordy) 
 So Hard (featuring Monica Blair) 
 Animal (featuring King Gordy and Razaaq)

References

External links 
 Detnews.com - D12's Bizarre celebrates new album with a release party

2007 albums
E1 Music albums
Bizarre (rapper) albums
Albums produced by Nick Speed